Rachel Costello is an Irish camogie player who made her senior debut for Dublin in 2009. She represented Dublin at senior, Junior and Minor levels in 2009. With the Naomh Fionnbarra club in Cabra, she won an Intermediate championship title.

She moved to Australia.

Her father Anthony played senior hurling for Dublin and in 2009 scored the winning goal for Naomh Fionnbarra in the Dublin Intermediate championship final when coming on as a substitute.

References

External links
 Video highlights of 2009 championship Part One and part two on YouTube
 Video of Dublin¹s 2009 championship match against Tipperary on YouTube

1991 births
Living people
Dublin camogie players